Parr may refer to:

People 
 Parr (artist) (1893–1969), Inuit artist
 Parr (surname)

Places 
 United Kingdom
 Parr, St Helens, a township in Merseyside
 Parr Brook, a stream in Greater Manchester

 United States
 Parr, Indiana
 Parr, Virginia

Other uses 
 one of the stages of a juvenile salmon's life cycle
 Pakistan Atomic Research Reactor
 Parr Nuclear Station, an experimental nuclear reactor in Parr, South Carolina